Serra de São Miguel is a microregion in the Brazilian state of Rio Grande do Norte.

Municipalities 
The microregion consists of the following municipalities:
Água Nova
Coronel João Pessoa
Doutor Severiano
Ecnanto
Luís Gomes
Major Sales
Riacho de Santana
São Miguel
Venha-Ver

References

Microregions of Rio Grande do Norte